Lambayeque is a department and region in northwestern Peru known for its rich Moche and Chimú historical past. The region's name originates from the ancient pre-Inca civilization of the Lambayeque. It is the second-smallest department in Peru after Tumbes, but it is also its most densely populated department and its eighth most populous department.

Etymology

The name Lambayeque is a Spanish derivation of the god Yampellec, said to have been worshipped by the first Lambayeque king, Naymlap. The Spanish gave the name to the early people.

Geography

The territory of the department of Lambayeque is made up of wide plains irrigated by rivers from the Andes; in most of the arid area, irrigation is needed to support any farming.  The fertile river valleys produce half of the sugar cane crop of Peru. In addition, Lambayeque and the department of Piura provide most of the rice crops consumed in Peru.

Increased agricultural harvest is expected with completion of the Olmos Transandino Project.  The water supply project will transfer up to 2 billion m3 annually of water from the Huancabamba River in the department of Cajamarca east of Lambayeque.

In the smaller scale farming of earlier centuries, the Olmos Carob Tree Forest supported goat herds that fed on carobs. The fine goatskins were tanned to create the fine, pale, leather known as "cordoban" or "cordovan", from the Spanish town of Córdoba, where the process was developed. Goat fat was used to make soap.

There are two small islands off the Pacific coast of the department of Lambayeque: Lobos de Afuera, and Lobos de Tierra; there was a dispute with the department of Piura over ownership of the latter island.

The region is bordered by the Piura Region on the north, the Cajamarca Region on the southeast, the La Libertad Region on the south and the Pacific Ocean on the west.

History

Legend tells that in ancient times, a great float of balsa rafts arrived at the beaches of the existing San José cove. Formed by a brilliant cortege of nine foreign warriors, this float was led by a man of great talent and courage, named Naymlap, the mythical founder of the first northwest civilization.

Among the descendants of Naymlap were the Moche and the Chimú, the latter builders of a great civilization forged in Lambayeque before being conquered by the later Inca Empire. The Chimú grew to acquire a notable state parallel to the Inca. The Chimú moved their capital to the northern area, establishing great urban centers there. They were great farmers, textile experts and, wonderful goldsmiths, with extraordinary works in gold. 

The Inca conquest of what today is Lambayeque, lasted almost four decades. Pachacuti, Tupac Inca Yupanqui and Huayna Cápac, successively, ruled during the process.

In the 16th century, the Spaniard leader Francisco Pizarro took his conquistadors across the region on the way to Cajamarca to conclude the defeat of the Inca empire. He was amazed by the gold exposed in vases and utensils.

During Colonial times, a rivalry started between the people of the towns of Lambayeque and Santiago de Miraflores de Saña. The reason of the conflict was the opulence in which the latter lived, even provoking the greed of pirates. A flood in 1720, however, destroyed Saña and marked the end of a flourishing city.

The people of Lambayeque followed Juan Manuel Iturregui as their leader in the struggles for emancipation and independence from Spain. He spread the libertarian ideas and helped get arms for the cause.

Archaeology 
In November 2019, Peruvian archaeologists led by Walter Alva discovered a 3,000-year-old, 130 feet long megalithic 'water cult' temple with 21 tombs in the Oyotún district in the Zaña Valley. Archaeologists assumed that the temple was abandoned around 250 BC and later used as a burial ground by the Chumy people. Twenty of the tombs belonged to the people of Chumy, and one to an adult male buried during the Formative period with a ceramic bottle with two spouts and a bridge handle. According to the excavations, as many as three construction phases took place in the temple: the first was between 1500 BC–800 BC, when people built the foundations of the building from cone-shaped clay; second, between 800 BC–400 BC, when the megalithic temple was built under the influence of the pre-Inca civilization known as the Chavin; and finally 400 BC–100 BC, when people added circular pillars used to hold the roof of the temple.

Political division

The department is divided into 3 provinces (provincias, singular: provincia), which are composed of 38 districts (distritos, singular: distrito). The provinces, with their capitals in parentheses, are:

 Chiclayo (Chiclayo)
 Ferreñafe (Ferreñafe)
 Lambayeque (Lambayeque)

Places of interest 
 Pómac Forest Historical Sanctuary
 Tucume Pyramids

Music from Lambayeque 

The most famous composer from Lambayeque was Luis Abelardo Nuñez, born in Ferreñafe on 22 November 1926. His songs are among the most popular ones in Peruvian music. These included the following:

 "Marinera norteña", Los Troveros Criollos
 Waltz: "Porqué no volverás?"
 Waltz: "Embrujo"

References

External links
Sugar Production in Peru 
Rice Production in Peru 
Olmos Project Information
 Chiclayo map
Museo Sipan 

 
Regions of Peru

no:Lambayeque